Bigej or Begej  (Marshallese:) Island is part of Kwajalein Atoll in the Ralik Chain in the Republic of the Marshall Islands (RMI), 2,100 nautical miles (3900 km) southwest of Honolulu, Hawaii.

The remains of a fuel tank farm built by the US Navy in 1944 are still present on the island.  Bigej is not part of the Reagan Test Site.

Bigej is uninhabited and has no buildings on it but many people from Kwajalein island in the south of the atoll come up to visit it for picnics and camping. It is covered with lush tropical palm trees and jungle. It is a site of cultural significance to the indigenous people of Kwajalein, as are most of the small islands throughout the atoll. Some Kwajalein landowners have proposed developing Bigej to look similar to the landscaped beauty of Kwajalein island, for the exclusive use of Kwajalein atoll landowners and their families. Recently Kwajalein landowners have already begun resettling Bigej, establishing several tents and simple homes there along the southern lagoon side.

References

Kwajalein Atoll
Islands of the Marshall Islands